Mintil (alternatively Batek Tanum, Tanɨm, or Mayah) is an Aslian language of Malaysia. It is considered to be a variety of the Batek language.

Background

In the late 1960s, Geoffrey Benjamin had come across speakers of Mintil among patients of an Orang Asli hospital at Ulu Gombak, just outside Kuala Lumpur.

Names and villages
The people are commonly referred to as Batek. Their villages are:

Kampung Sungai Garam (Tɔm Mayɛm) (4° 27’ 12” N, 102° 3’ 20” E; 2.5 km south of Kampung Dada Kering)
Kampung Bencah Kelubi (Batuˀ Jalaŋ) (4° 38’ 23” N, 101° 58’ 45” E; 4 km east of Kampung Telok Gunong)
Kampung Paya Keladi (Tɔm Hɨyaŋ) (4° 24’ 18” N, 101° 55’ 27” E; 10 km north of Kampung Chegar Perah)
Kampung Tɔm Kəlkɔəˀ (4° 34’ 39” N, 101° 59’ 43” E; 2 km north of Kampung Kubang Rusa)

See also
 Batek language

References

Languages of Malaysia
Aslian languages